Anthony Herbert may refer to:
Anthony Reed Herbert, British far right politician
Anthony Herbert (footballer), Trinidadian footballer
Anthony Herbert (rugby), Australian rugby (union and league) footballer
Anthony Herbert (lieutenant colonel), American soldier of the Korean and Vietnam Wars

See also
Tony Herbert, Irish Fianna Fáil senator and sportsperson